The Blues Don't Change is an album by American blues musician Albert King. He recorded it at the Stax Records studio in Memphis, Tennessee, in 1973 and 1974.  In 1977, Stax released the album with the same songs and running order as The Pinch.

The album is composed of soul- and rhythm and blues-oriented songs written by Mack Rice and others, including a re-working of King's popular 1966 song "Oh, Pretty Woman".

Reception

In a review for AllMusic, critic Richie Unterberger notes "These are some of King's most soul-oriented sessions, with contributions from the Memphis Horns and a couple of the MG's." He added that the album focuses more on King's vocals rather than his guitar playing.

Track listing
"The Blues Don't Change" (Mack Rice, John Gary Williams) – 5:26
"I'm Doing Fine" (Erma Clanton, Earl Randle) – 3:50
"Nice to Be Nice (Ain't That Nice)" (Willie Ghee, Rice) – 3:02
"Oh, Pretty Woman" (A.C. Williams) – 4:45
"King of Kings" (Henry Bush, Allen A. Jones) – 3:28
"Feel the Need" (Abrim Tilmon, Johnny Allen) – 3:30
"Firing Line (I Don't Play With Your Woman, You Don't Play With Mine)" (Rice) – 3:44
"The Pinch Paid Off, Pt. 1" (Permiller Ward, Helen Washington) – 3:42
"The Pinch Paid Off, Pt. 2" (Ward, Washington) – 4:50
"I Can't Stand the Rain" (Don Bryant, Bernard Miller, Ann Peebles) – 2:52
"Ain't It Beautiful" (Bush, Jones, Carl Smith) – 4:01

Personnel
 Albert King – electric guitar, vocals
 Michael Toles – guitar
 Vernon Burch – guitar
 Bobby Manuel – guitar
 Lester Snell – keyboards
 Marvell Thomas – keyboards
 Winston Stewart – keyboards
 Donald Dunn – bass guitar
 Earl Thomas – bass guitar
 Al Jackson Jr. – drums
 Willie Hall – drums
 William C. Brown III – background vocals
 Henry Bush – background vocals
 Hot Butter & Soul – background vocals
 The Memphis Horns – horns

References

Blues Don't Change, The
Blues Don't Change, The
Albums produced by Allen Jones (record producer)
Stax Records albums